Georg Axhausen (24 March 1877, in Landsberg an der Warthe – 19 January 1960, in Berlin) was a German oral and maxillofacial surgeon.

He studied medicine at Kaiser-Wilhelms-Akademie (Pépinière) in Berlin, receiving his doctorate in 1901. Later on, he worked in the surgical clinic at Kiel under Heinrich Helferich (1904–06) and in the institute of pathology at Friedrichshain Hospital in Berlin under Ludwig Pick (1907/08). From 1909 to 1924 he worked in the surgical clinic at the Berlin-Charité.

In 1908 he obtained his habilitation, and four years later became an associate professor at Berlin. In 1928 he was named a full professor and director of the dental institute at the Charité.

He specialized in pathology and surgery of bones and joints, being known for his pioneer studies of bone grafting and necrosis of the epiphysis. He is credited with introducing the term "aseptic necrosis", which is now referred to as avascular necrosis. The eponymous "Axhausen operation" is a procedure for closure of cleft palate.

Selected works 
 Die Kriegswundbehandlung im Kiefer-Gesichtsbereich, 1941 – War wound treatment in the jaw-facial area. 
 Die allgemeine Chirurgie in der Zahn-, Mund- und Kieferheilkunde, 1943 – General surgery in dentistry, oral and maxillofacial surgery.
 Leitfaden der zahnärztlichen Chirurgie : Einführung in die klinische Zahnheilkunde für Studierende der Medizin und der Zahnheilkunde in 16 Vorlesungen, 1950 – Guide to dental surgery: Introduction to clinical dentistry for students of medicine and dentistry in 16 lectures.
 Technik und Ergebnisse der Spaltplastiken, 1952.

References 

1877 births
1960 deaths
People from Gorzów Wielkopolski
Academic staff of the Humboldt University of Berlin
German maxillofacial surgeons